Easington, also known as Easington Village, is a village and civil parish in eastern County Durham, England. It is located at the junction of the A182 and B1283, leading north-west to Hetton-le-Hole and south east to Horden. 

It is near the A19, which travels north to Seaham and Sunderland as well as south to Peterlee and Stockton-on-Tees. The population of Easington Village was 2,164 in 2001, increasing slightly to 2,171 at the 2011 Census.

History

There is evidence of Easington having been an important pre-Norman conquest site, including architectural fragments (dating from as early as the 8th century) found within the fabric of St Mary's Church. St Mary's itself is mostly 12th–13th century, and contains a notable amount of seventeenth-century woodwork. From 1256 until 1832 the Rector of Easington was also Archdeacon of Durham. 

One of the most prominent events in the long history of the village was the hanging of two men on the village green for involvement in the plot to replace Tudor monarch Queen Elizabeth with Mary, Queen of Scots. Pope Adrian IV (c. 1100–1 September 1159), born Nicholas Breakspear, lived here for a time. The village is also known as the setting of the folktale, "The Legend of the Easington hare".

The village is home to one of the few remaining 13th-century domestic buildings (open-hall) in the country, Seaton Holme. It became an archdeacon's residence, served as the rectory until around 1960 and was a children's home for a time before falling into disrepair. In 1992 it was finally restored to a semblance of its former stature.

Overshadowed
The sinking of coal mines near the village began on 11 April 1899. The settlement of Easington Colliery developed around the colliery. The settlements along the B1283 road has resulted in both settlements merging. However, the two places have retained their distinctive characters and continue to reflect different trends. Easington Colliery was the last pit to close on the Durham Coalfields in 1993, with the loss of 1,400 jobs.

Amenities
There were two post offices in Easington. The one in the town serves the top of Easington, the middle post office serves the area which is predominantly council properties, and the lower post office served the colliery housing area. This post office closed on 10 October 2008 after being cut in the closure scheme by the Post Office. Easington Academy is located in the village. It acts as the main secondary school for the village and surrounding area.

Demography
Easington is notable for being the town with the highest percentage of white residents in England (99.2% white in 2001). According to the results of the 2001 census, it also has the UK's lowest population of Jedi knights.

Notable people 
Matt Baker – television presenter (Blue Peter, Countryfile, The One Show)

Dennis Donnini – VC recipient
Steve Harper – Newcastle United goalkeeper
Rachel Howard – artist
Jez Lowe – folksinger and songwriter
Kevin Scott – Newcastle United footballer
Tom Simpson – champion cyclist
Adam Johnson – Sunderland footballer
Alan Tate – Swansea City footballer
James Isaacson – Newcastle Falcons rugby player
Ian Cranson – Ipswich, Sheffield Wednesday and Stoke City footballer.

In popular culture 
The film Billy Elliot, set in the fictional County Durham town of Everington, was mainly shot in Easington, though the filmmakers had to go a long way north to Ellington to find the only working mine in the North East. The subsequent stage musical version specifically identifies Easington as its location.

References 

Towns in County Durham